Nettie Moore may refer to:

"Nettie Moore" (song), a song on Bob Dylan's Modern Times album
Nettie Moore (singer), a singer in the U.S. who recorded on Black Swan Records
"Gentle Nettie Moore", an American song by Marshall S. Pike and J. S. Pierpont (the song is credited with inspiring Dylan's Nettie Moore song)